The Bishop of Chicago refers to one of the following religious leaders based in Chicago, Illinois, United States.

Catholic Church:
Roman Catholic Archbishop of Chicago (Latin Church)
Bishop of the St. Thomas Syro-Malabar Catholic Diocese of Chicago (Syro-Malabar Church)
Bishop of the Ukrainian Catholic Eparchy of Saint Nicholas of Chicago (Ukrainian Greek Catholic Church)
Episcopal Bishop of Chicago
Bishop (or Metropolitan) of the Greek Orthodox Metropolis of Chicago
List of bishops of the Russian Orthodox Church Outside Russia